Whalley can mean:

Places
Whalley, Lancashire, England, a village
Whalley Abbey, a former Cistercian abbey
Whalley railway station
Whalley, Surrey, neighbourhood and city centre in the city of Surrey, British Columbia, Canada
Whalley Range, Blackburn
Whalley Range, Manchester

People
Arthur Whalley (1886–1952), English footballer banned for life for match fixing
Bert Whalley (1913–1958), English footballer and coach
Boff Whalley (born 1961), former lead guitarist of the band Chumbawamba
Duncan Whalley (born 1979), English cricketer
Edward Whalley (c. 1607–c. 1675), an English military leader during the English Civil War
Fred Whalley (1898–1976), English footballer
Gareth Whalley (born 1973), English-born footballer who qualifies to play for the Republic of Ireland
George Whalley (1915–1983), Canadian scholar, poet and naval officer, brother of Peter Whalley
George Hammond Whalley (1813–1878), British lawyer and politician
Gillian Whalley, New Zealand sonographer
Hampden Whalley (1851–?), British politician and soldier, son of George Hammond Whalley
J. Irving Whalley (1902–1980), American politician
Joan Whalley (born 1927), Australian actress, teacher and artistic director
Joan Whalley (footballer) (1921–1998), English female footballer
Joanne Whalley (born 1961), English actress
John Whalley (MP) (c. 1633–?), English Member of Parliament
Lawrence Whalley (born c. 1921?), British psychologist and academic
Michael Whalley (1953–2008), Republican member of the New Hampshire House of Representatives
Norma Whalley, Australian-born actress on Broadway in 1899 and in film in the 1920s and 1930s
Óscar Whalley (born 1994), Spanish footballer
Peter Whalley (1921–2007), Canadian cartoonist and sculptor
Peter Whalley (clergyman) (1722–1791), English clergyman, academic and schoolmaster
Richard Whalley (died 1583) (1498–1583), English Member of Parliament
Richard Whalley (died c. 1632), English Member of Parliament
Samuel Whalley (1800–1883), British Radical politician
Selwyn Whalley (1934–2008), English footballer
Shaun Whalley (born 1987), English footballer

See also
Walley, a list of people with the surname
Wally (disambiguation)
Whaley (disambiguation)